The 2012–13 Tatran Prešov season is the 14th straight season that the club will play in the Slovak First League, the highest tier of football in Slovakia.

Squad 
As of 28 February 2013

For recent transfers, see List of Slovak football transfers winter 2012–13.

Transfers

In

Out

Pre-season and friendlies

Competition

Slovak First Football League

Matches

Slovnaft Cup

Sources: soccerway.com, UEFA.com

References

1. FC Tatran Prešov seasons
Tatran Presov